The 2018 Minnesota Secretary of State election was held on November 6, 2018, to elect the secretary of state of the U.S. state of Minnesota. Steve Simon, the incumbent and Minnesota Democratic–Farmer–Labor Party (DFL) nominee, won the election.

Background
DFL incumbent Steve Simon was first elected in 2014—succeeding two-term DFL incumbent Mark Ritchie, who did not seek re-election. Simon announced on January 23, 2018, that he would seek re-election.

Candidates

Republican Party of Minnesota
 John Howe, member of the Minnesota Senate from 2011 to 2013; candidate for the Republican nomination for Minnesota Secretary of State in 2014

Howe was endorsed by the Republicans on June 2, 2018, at their state convention.

Minnesota Democratic–Farmer–Labor Party
 Steve Simon, incumbent since 2015

Simon was endorsed by the DFL on June 1, 2018, at their state convention.

Minor parties and independents
 William Denney, Independence Party of Minnesota

General election

Predictions

Results

See also
 Minnesota elections, 2018

References

External links
 Elections & Voting - Minnesota Secretary of State
Official Minnesota Secretary of State candidate websites
William Denney (I) for Secretary of State
John Howe (R) for Secretary of State
Steve Simon (D) for Secretary of State

2018 Minnesota elections
Minnesota Secretary of State elections
November 2018 events in the United States
Minnesota